Yann Toma (born 1969 in Neuilly-sur-Seine) is both an artist and a researcher, the lifelong president of the company Ouest-Lumière and an artist-observer within the UN, where he sits as an entrepreneurial artist.
With projects always anchored in a societal context, Yann Toma's fundamental idea is to rebuild the link. Connecting with ourselves, our collective memory, and the transforming power generated by the mass, art is used here as a means of materializing energy flows but also as an energy in its own right.

Yann Toma is a French contemporary artist and a researcher. He positions his work and his reflection on the border of the artistic expression, always involved in political and social events. Toma places the artist as responsible for social debate. As a mediator he can invite people to get involved, to take part of a collaborative energy. 
Toma collaborates with entreprises, political scientists as well as philosophers. By salvaging material from former electric power company Ouest-Lumière in the early 1990s, he has appropriated a symbolic network, an industrial infrastructure which he turned into his research territory and the very matter of his activity. Toma, president for life of Ouest Lumière, is also an artist-observer within the U.N where he sits as an entrepreneurial artist.

Artistic energy 
Toma developed the concept of artistic energy. He appropriated a symbolic network, an infrastructure coming from factories of which he made his territory of research and the subject of his activity. "Ouest-Lumière" is above all about an immaterial network which the artist established patiently, a network of subterranean resistance resting on the notion of memory and report.
His personal but collaborative exhibition Dynamo-Fukushima, exhibited at the Grand Palais for the Heritage Days of September 2011, attracted more than 17,000 people in two days. This focus on collective energy and solidarity, after the nuclear disaster of Fukushima in this case, is the tone of Toma's favorite topic.

Career positions 
The artist is also a PHD professor and a researcher in University of Paris 1 Pantheon-Sorbonne where he manages the team of research CNRS (French national center for scientific research), named " Art & Flux " which is as much a look-out post, an observatory of theoretical and critical research, as a laboratory of experiment and artistic production. Art & Flux (Art and Flows) reports in a critical way what connects the art, the economy and the society. He is the author of the collective work Les entreprises critiques (" The critical companies ") and of Artistes & Entreprises (Artists & Companies).

Collections 
The artistic work of Toma is part of numerous collections. His work is integrated in particular into the collection of Centre Georges Pompidou and was put in the inventory of the National Art Collection of Contemporary Art in 2007. He is represented by the Bourouina Gallery Germany, in Berlin. A monography, entitled "Yann Toma" (texts, conversations, 700 photos and illustrations), went out to September 2011 which presents the extent of his work and artistic flux of the President for life of Ouest-Lumière. His personal participative exhibition in the Grand Palais Dynamo-Fukushima (in September 2011) gathered more than 17,000 visitors in two days.
The French national memorial created for the centennial of the World War I is the last monumental artwork of the artist. At night, the monument called L'Anneau de la mémoire becomes La Grande Veilleuse ("The Great Wake Light") and the memory of 580,000 soldiers keeps shining when the visitors are gone.

Artistic route

Personal exhibitions 

1992, 1994 
Élaboration du Mémorial de l'Usine Ouest Lumière (Elaboration of the Memorial of the Factory Ouest Lumière), Espace EDF, Puteaux, France

1997 
L'Usine fantasmagorique, (The phantasmagorical Factory), Centers art and culture of the Farm of Buisson, Noisiel 
La vitrine de l'officine du docteur Bartok (The shop window of the pharmacy of doctor Bartok), Révillon d'Apreval Gallery, Paris, France 
Le cercle de la crypte (The circle of the crypt), Caves de l'AFAA, Ministry of Foreign and European Affairs (France), Paris, France 
Alchimie souterraine (Subterranean alchemy), Chez Eve Marie-Chauvin, Paris, France

1998 
Plovdiski noshti, Alliance Française (French alliance) of Bulgaria and Gallery Gamma, Plovdiv, Bulgaria

1999 
Ostension de Rose HEIM, 'La hune' Bookshop, Paris, France 
Les nuits de Plovdiv, Affaires culturelles de la Ville de Paris (Cultural affairs of the City of Paris), AFAA, Paris(Association Française d’Action Artistique – French association of Artistic Action)

2000 
Restes lumière, Galerie Valérie Cueto, Paris, France

2001 
Crimes sur commande (Crimes to order), Espace huit novembre, Paris, France

2002 
Contrôle qualité (Quality control), Patricia Dorfmann Galery, Paris, France
Ouest-Lumière – Laboratoire de recherche (Research laboratory), Patricia Dorfmann Galery, Paris, France
Début de transmission (At the beginning of transmission), Cité internationale universitaire de Paris, France

2003 
Procédure de Rappel (Procedure of Reminder), Bibliothèque Nationale de France, Paris, France
 BF15 AIRPORT, BF15, Lyon, France
Ouverture de l’ABRI, Paris, France

2004 
"Ouest-Lumière", The Brewers, Liège, Belgium 
Traitement de faveur (Special treatment), La Blanchisserie, Boulogne, France

2005 
Ouest-Lumière 1905–2005, CCC, Tours 
Flux radiants et Transmission Annecy, (Radiant Flows and Transmission Annecy ), Castle museum, Annecy
Ouest-Lumière, Center of art La Passerelle, Brest, France

2006 
Good vibrations, Alliance française of New Delhi, India 
Part de jouissance (Part of enjoyment), Patricia Dorfmann Galery, Paris, France

2007 
Part de jouissance 2 (Part of enjoyment 2), Centre d’art contemporain d’Epinal (Contemporary Arts Center of Epinal), Epinal, France

2008 
Ouest-Lumière la collection (31-05,31-08), Museum EDF Electropolis, Mulhouse, France

2009
BANKROT, Bourouina Gallery, Berlin, 6th District, Germany
Dynamo POST-BANKRUPT, Musée Zadkine, Paris, France 
BANKROT, Cultural French Ambassy, New York, United States 
CROSSING WAYS, UNO, New York, United States

2010
Security Council, United Nations, New York City 
Geysir Ouest-Lumière, Abbaye de Royaumont, France

2011 
Dynamo-Fukushima, Grand Palais, Paris 
There was chemistry, Walls and bridges, French Embassy in the United States, New York City 
Security Council, Monumental work, La Villette, Paris – CO² Storage/Sculptures de CO², Hôtel Lutetia, FIAC, Paris, France 
General Assembly, UN, United Nations, New York – Incursiòn en la ONU, Bogota, Colombia 
Wikileaks : Les câbles litigieux Ouest-Lumière (Wikileaks : The litigious cables Ouest-Lumière), Incognito Artclub, Paris, France 
Geysir Ouest-Lumière, Abbaye de Royaumont, France
Transmission Karlsruhe, KAMUNA, Karlsruher Museumsnacht, Germany

2012 
L’Or Bleu (the blue gold), In association with Francis Kurkdjian, Le Bazacle, foundation EDF, Toulouse, France

2013
TRANSvision, light work and video installation, main guest of Montrouge Biennale, Le Beffroi, Montrouge, France
TRANScorp. light transmission,  interactive and permanent artwork, La Briqueterie, Vitry-sur-Seine, France
The Man in Gold, Alvin Alto Gallery, Helsinki, Finland

2014
Observations on Secrecy, Surveillance and Censorship, drawings, "Logan Symposium", The Barbican Centre, London
Climate March & General Assembly, engagement and civic investigation, New-York, United States
La Grande Veilleuse (The Great Wake Light), monumental work mixing light and architecture, in collaboration with the architecture agency AAPP. French national memorial of the World War I, Notre-Dame-de-Lorette, Ablain-Saint-Nazaire, France
PLASMA, personal exhibition around the series "Les Restitutions". Bourouina Gallery, Berlin

2015
Human Energy, monumental and participative installation, Eiffel Tower, Paris, France
Climate Statements, portraits of States Chiefs drawn at the UN headquarters, Espace Krajcberg, Paris, France

2016
Liberty Light, Eiffel Tower, Paris, New-York
Flux Radiants : l’énergie que nous avons en nous, photographie, Peugeot Avenue, Pekin, China
Drawings about Wikileaks, Variation Paris Media Artfair, during FIAC, Paris, France
Sculptures, Société de Service, Plateforme, Paris, France
Flux Radiants, Art of Change 21 à la COP22, Le Riad Yima, Marrakech, Maroc
Câbles Ouest-Lumière, in Sociétés de service, Plateforme, Paris, France
Energetic Cover, photographie, Socialter, France
YEW : Youth Energy Water, oeuvre monumenatale participative, La Manera de Marrakech, Maroc
Human Greenergy, oeuvre monumentale participative, Baitaisi White Dagoba Temple, Beijing Design Week, Beijing, China
Human Lux, installation, Musée de l’Homme, IHEST Ministère de la Recherche, Paris, France
Ouest-Lumière Papers Show, dessins/drawings, Incognito Art Club, Paris, France
Signing Ceremony, drawings, General Assembly, United Nations, New York, United States
Change Power, Portraits Logan Symposium, BCC, Berlin, Germany

2017
The United Nations General Assembly, performances, New York, United States
Flux radiants, photographies, [[Paris Photo, Banque Neuflize, Paris, France
Tokyo Tour, série de performances, Tokyo, Japan
The Artist in Residence for life at the UN, série d’interventions, New York, United States

2018
Réactivation Ouest-Lumière, Espace Immanence, Paris, France

2019
Transmission IV: Freedom for plants and the new pact for humanity, France-Romania Season, Institut Français, Timișoara, Romania 
Transmission III: listen to the secrets of the world, Saison France-Romania, Institut Français]], Iasi, Romania 
Brain Plants, Saison France-Roumanie, Institut Français, Victoria Gallery, Iasi, Romania 
In situ work, Saison France-Roumanie, Institut Français, Central de Interes, Iasi, Romania 
Transmission II : The one who speak to the plants, International Light Day, Saison France-Roumanie, Institut Français, Cluj, Romania 
Transmission I : Words of love & wishes for the world, Institut Français, Bucharest, Romania

Collective exhibitions
1994 
Regard, Carottages en terre de l’Usine Ouest Lumière (Glance, Core drillings in earth of the Factory Ouest Lumière), Unesco, Paris, France
1995 
Chez l’un, Cercles d’ampoules (To the one, Encircle of bulbs), Anton Weller Gallery, Paris, France
1996 
La réserve des blancs manteaux (The reserve of the white coats), L’atelier parisien, Paris, France 
Chez l’un, Cabinet alchimique (To the one, Cabinet alchimique), Anton Weller Gallery, Paris – Biennale de Champigny, Mausolée de l’ouvrier inconnu (Mausoleum of the unknown worker), Champigny, France
Monument et modernité (Monument and modernity), Espace Electra, Paris, France 
Chez l’un, Camera obscura (To the one, Camera obscura), Anton Weller Gallery, Paris, France
1997 
Réveillons-nous, Sous l’asphalte (Let us wake up, Under the asphalt), Anton Weller Gallery, Valentin, Météo, Paris, France 
Renvoi d’ascenseur – Opération Sztreminski (Cross-reference of elevator – Operation Sztreminski), Musée cinématographique de Lódz, Poland 
Le complot (The plot), institut Cochin de génétique moléculaire (Cochin institute of molecular genetics), Paris, France 
Empoussièrement du musée Napoléonien (Dustment of the Napoleonic museum), Ministry of Culture, Fontainebleau, France
1998 
Bruits secrets (Secret Rumours), Silicates de sodium (Silicates of sodium), CCC, Tours, France 
Ostension 1, EDF-ACT 91- City hall of La Norville, France
1999 
9.0, Ostension du corps de Marianne Ripp (9.0, Ostension of Marianne Ripp's body), Web Bar, Paris, France 
Un lieu en travaux, Garage de soucoupes volantes (A place in works, Garage of spaceships), IUFM d’Étiolles, Étiolles – FIAC, Les Extases, Anton Weller Gallery, Paris, France 
Bateau Laboratoire, Paris vu du ciel (Boat Laboratory, Paris seen by the sky), Espace Bateau Lavoir, Paris, France 
Biennale des jeunes créateurs d’Europe et de la Méditerranée, Variation pour cinq housses (Biennial event of the young creators of Europe and the Mediterranean Sea, Variation for five covers), Rome, Italy
Events, Crimes sur commande (Vents, Crimes to order), Yvon Lambert Gallery, Paris, France 
Work-shop, Variation pour quatre housses (Work-shop, Variation for four covers), Anton Weller Gallery, Paris, France 
Nécropolis, Ostension du corps de Laurent Claquin (Nécropolis, Ostension of Laurent Claquin's body), Georges-Philippe and Nathalie Vallois Gallery, Paris
2000 
aaa,  archiving as art, Ouest-Lumière télémarketing, Isea, Paris, France 
Work shop, Images-flash, UFR 04, Paris, France 
Trafic de clones (Traffic of clones), Le cabinet M, Ivry 
L’art contemporain au risque du clonage (The contemporary art at the risk of the cloning), Le représentant, Vert le Petit 
Élémentaire, L’AFFAIRE de l’église St-Germain (Elementary, THE AFFAIR of the church St-Germain), Amiens 
L’incurable mémoire des corps, Le lieu de l’Incurable (Incurable memory of bodies, place of the Incurable), Ivry-sur-Seine 
Immanence, White houses, Infiltration, Paris – Argos project, Infiltration, Vevey, Switzerland 
Usine, ouvrier-ouvrière (Factory, male worker – female worker), Paris, France 
Lumière aux Cordeliers, Variation pour trente-six housses (Light to the Cordeliers, Variation for thirty six covers), Couvent des Cordeliers, Paris 
Sous l'asphalte (Under the asphalt Within the framework of the Parcours Saint Germain, Paris, France 
Promesses pour les années 2000 (Promises for 2000s), Ostension of the body of Stéphane Pianacci, CFDT, Paris, France 
Emplacement-déplacement IV, II ostension du corps de Marianne Ripp (Location – Travel IV, II ostension of Marianne Ripp's body), Anton Weller Gallery, Paris. 
Emplacement-Déplacement III, Ostension du corps de Nathalie F (Location – Travel IV, II ostension of Nathali F), Anton Weller Gallery, Paris, France
2001
Quand l'art contemporain s'expose au débat public (When the contemporary art exposes itself to the public debate), Traversées, ARC Musée d'Art Moderne de la Ville de Paris (Museum of Modern Art of the City of Paris), Paris, France 
Facteur de troubles (Factor of disorders), Paris West University Nanterre La Défense, Nanterre (within the framework of the line of research for the CERAP "praxis et altérités", praxis and otherness) 
Effervescence, Contrôle qualité (Excitement, Quality control), Georges-Philippe and Nathalie Vallois Excitement, Quality control, Paris 
Personal light, Organismus, Kunsthauss, Hambourg, Germany – Dix poumons (Ten lungs), In association with Goran Vejvoda, MNAM Centre Georges Pompidou, Paris, France 
Jardin d’émotions (Garden of feelings), Specimen Ouest-Lumière, Musée Vera, Saint-Germain-en-Laye 
Immersion périscopique (Periscopic dumping), BATTERY SHOP, MACHINE SHOP, ELECTRICAL SHOP, Centre d’art de Soissons 
Situation, Dix séances au rayon violet (Situation, Ten sessions in the purple beam), Institut d’astrophysique, Paris, France 
Rouge, extase n°2 et l’AFFAIRE du boulevard de Reuilly (Red, ecstasy n°2 and the AFFAIR of the boulevard of Reuilly), Valérie Cueto Gallery, Paris, France
2002 
Sémaphore 1, Salon du patrimoine (Lounge of the holdings), Caroussel du Louvre,  Paris, France 
Fête des lumières (Party of the lights), Transmission Pernon, Lyon 
Nuit blanche, Transmission Oberkampf, Paris – Flux radiants (Radiant Flows), La friche de la belle de mai (Astéride), Marseille 
Star 67, Ouest-Lumière production, Brooklyn, New York
2003 
Showroom #3 : Imposture légitime (Showroom 3: imposture legitimizes), Patricia Dorfmann Gallery, Paris 
Ma petite entreprise (My small firm), Centre d’art de Meymac (Center of art of Meymac), Meymac 
Crime de Nathalie F (Crime of Nathalie F), FIAC, Patricia Dorfmann Gallery, Paris, France 
Vies à vies (Lives to lives), Parcours Saint-Germain, Paris, France
2004 
Nu radiant (Radiant nude), FIAC, Patricia Dorfmann Galery, Paris, France 
Transmission Ivry, Exposition Polyptyque, Ivry sur Seine 
Nous assurons votre avenir énergétique, La rue aux artistes (We insure your energy future, The street to the artists), Viacom, 300 4/3 panels in all France 
Shelter Ouest-Lumière, Le Vent des forêts, forêt de Marcaulieu 
Affaire du museum Franz Gertsch (Affair of the museum Franz Gertsch), Kallmann Museum, Munich, Germany 
Chambre de contrôle (Chamber of control), Espace EDF Electra, Paris, France 
Douce France (Soft France), Culturgest, Lisbon, Portugal 
 True Lies, Musée Franz Gertsch, Burgdorf, Switzerland
2005 
FIAC, Service des Armes de destruction massive – Destruction de 7000 magazines Technikart (FIAC, Department of Weapons of mass destruction – Destruction of 7000 magazines Technikart), Ouest-Lumière 
Neuf Crimes sur commandes (Nine Crimes on orders), Patricia Dorfmann Galery, Paris, France 
Chromoscaphe 1, Laboratoires du Musée du Louvre, Paris (within the framework of "Lumière-Couleur") 
Lancement du Radion (Launch of Radion), Art A3, Paris, France 
Pit of the company Ouest-Lumière, Centre des Jeunes Dirigeants, Paris, France 
Crimes sur commande, Face à Faces, AFAA, Artcurial, Paris, France
2006 
Walls of Neemrana, École des Beaux arts, Rouen, France 
Soucoupe volante (Spaceship), Les Peintres de la vie moderne (The Painters of the modern life), Georges Pompidou Center, Donation Collection photographique de la Caisse des Dépôts (Donation photographic Collection of the Deposit office ) 
Face to Faces, AFAA, Stockholm, Sweden 
État du monde (State of the world), Espace III, Toulouse 
 Face to Faces, AFAA, Edinburgh, Scotland 
 Face to Faces, AFAA, Reykjavík, Iceland 
Dormir, rêver ... et autres nuits (Sleep, dream and the other nights), CAPC, Bordeaux 
Face à Faces, AFAA, Maison Rouge, Paris, France
2007 
Inondazione, Luce di Pietra, Palais Farnèse, Ambassade de France (Embassy of France), Rome, Italy
2008 
L'argent, Ouest-Lumière Stock Exchange (Money, Ouest-Lumière Stock Exchange', 18-06,17-08), Le plateau, Paris (curator : Elisabeth Lebovici) 
Biennale di Alessandria "Shapes of time" (29-05,31-08), Alessandria, Italy 
MONEY,  (29-03,30-05), Sino Company, Düsseldorf, Germany (curator : Dr. Reinhard Spieler) 
Whats'up 2009 (14-06,2-08-08),  Bourouina Gallery,  Berlin 
Art Paris 2008, Patricia Dorfmann Galery, Grands Palais, Paris, France
2009 
The wealth of nations, Patricia Dorfmann Galery, Paris, France 
Flux, Paris Photo, Patricia Dorfmann Galery, Paris, France
GENIPULATION, Centre Pasquart, Bienne, Switzerland 
Face to face, Musée de la photographie, Thessalonica, Greece 
Geysir, Musée National d'art contemporain (National museum of contemporary art), Thessalonica, Greece 
Weak signals / Wild cards, Tentoonstelling, Amsterdam, Netherlands 
Princess Frog, Jozsa Gallery, Brussels, Belgium 
Art Brussels International Art Fair, Bourouina Gallery, Belgium 
JOIN US, BVA & YT, the Armory Show, New York 
Wealth of nations, Patricia Dorfmann Galery, Paris, France
2010 
Hypothèses Vérification, Laboratoire art & science (Hypotheses Check, Laboratory art and science), Moscow, Russia 
Ouest-Lumière CO2 Storage, Le pire n'est jamais certain (The worst is never certain), Chapelle des Templiers, Metz, France
2011 
Art & Bicyclette (Art and Bicycle), Espace d’art concret (Space of concrete art), commissariat Paul Ardenne Fabienne Fulchéri, Mouans-Sartoux 
Genius Loci, Hôtel Fonfreyde, Centre photographique (Photographic center), commissariat Garance Chabert, Clermont Ferrand 
Art et argent (Art and money), liaisons dangereuses (dangerous connections), Musée de la Monnaie de Paris (Museum of the Currency of Paris), Paris 
Lumière Noire (Black light), Staatliche Kunsthalle Karlsruhe, kurator Dr. Alexander Eiling, Germany 
Rupture mon amour (Break my love), Maison des Arts de Malakoff, commissariat de Aude Cartier, France – Lumière Noire (Black light), Staatliche Kunsthalle Karlsruhe, Germany 
Monumental, Musée de Belfort 
Rupture mon amour, La Maison des Arts, Malakoff
2013 
Somaflux, "D-light, 3ème édition", Happen Space Accenture, Paris, France
World Energizing, art fair Show Off, Espace Cardin, Paris, France 
"Æsthetic Transactions"  with Carsten Höller, Tatiana Trouvé, ORLAN. Michel Journiac Gallery, Paris (curator : Richard Shusterman)
CO2 Storage, Art Paris Art Fair, Bourouina Gallery. Grand Palais, Paris, France
Flux Radiants, "Brincar com a Luz", Rio, Brazil
Occupy Laguardia, "Figures du sommeil", Jean Collet Gallery, Vitry-sur-Seine, France
Cabine à flux 1,2 et 3 en collaboration avec Mathieu Lehanneur, JWT/Maison Cailler/ Nestlé, at Broc, Genève then Zurich, Suisse
2014
Les Restitutions, art fair Show Off Variation, Espace des blancs manteaux, Paris, France
Sculptures Wikileaks, "Absurde, vous avez dit absurde?", Les Filles du Calvaire Gallery, Paris, France
Walls of Neemrana/ Dynamo-Fukushima, "Ensemble", Defacto La Gallery, Paris (curator : Paul Ardenne)
Video installation Dynamo-Fukushima, "Velodream, Art & Bike", Wroclaw, Poland
Ouest-Lumière, "Business Model, Entreprises d'Artiste", La Vitrine AM, Paris, France
Sidération du Général André Bach, "Fusillés pour l'exemple – Les fantômes de la République", Hôtel de ville, Paris, France
2015
Statements, portraits of States Chiefs drawn at the UN headquarters, Drawing Now Paris, Carreau du Temple, Paris, France
Human Dynamo/ CO2 storage/ Les Restitutions, "Post-Carbone", headquarter of La Poste Group, Paris, France 
2016
Drawings about Wikileaks, Variation, Artfair, during FIAC, France
Sculptures, Société de Service, Plateforme, Paris, France
2018
Ex Voto, Sourcil du Président à vie de Ouest-Lumière, in Rikiki 2, Galerie Satellite, Paris, France
Ouest-Lumière, in 20 years of the EDF Foundation, Espace EDF Electra, Paris, France
COLLECTION DAVID H. BROLLIET, GENEVA, Art Basel, Saint-Louis, France
White Card, Festival MAD (Multiple Art Days), Editions Baudouin Jannink, Hôtel de la monnaie, Paris, France
Holistic Schemas, UFO Festival, Nice, France
Lacry-Mots, in Christmas Project, Immanence/New Immanence, Paris, France
2019
Morse transmission, Cluj Never Sleep Festival, Cluj, Romania
"Tropical/exotic gardens, Workshop "Art, gardens, scenography, and sustainable development", Panthéon Sorbonne, Palermo, Italia

Prizes and awards 
2014 : medal of honor from the city of Montrouge
2004 : FIACRE DAP, France
2002 : Price od l’œuvre sociale de l’année (Price of " the social work of the year "), APC, city of Lyon
1997 : AFAA/Mairie de Paris, City hall of Paris
1995 : Fondation EDF

Publications

Books by Yann Toma 
 Yann Toma, Monograph (in several languages), under the direction of Yann Toma, Foreword Édouard Glissant, 10 authors, Éditions Jannink (publisher), Paris, 672 illustrations, 2011.
 Les entreprises critiques/Critical companies, bilingual, Cité du design Éditions/CERAP Éditions-Publishing, Saint-Étienne, France , 2008
 Ouest-Lumière – La Collection, Éditions Jannink (publisher), Paris, 2008
 Part de jouissance (Part of enjoyment), Éditions Jannink, Paris, 2007
 Abri mode d'emploi (Shelter instructions for use), Michel Baverey Éditions (publisher), Paris, 2003
 Plovdiski Noschti, AFAA, Victoires Éditions (publisher), Paris, 1999
 Crimes sur commande (Crimes to order), Victoires Éditions (publisher), Paris, 1998
 In association with Richard Conte and M. Tabeaud, L’Usine dans l’espace francilien (The Factory in the space inhabitant of Ile-de-France), la Sorbonne publishing, 2001
 Supervised by Yann Toma, La Cheminée phosphorescente (The phosphorescent Fireplace), Victoires publishing, 2000

Books about Yann Toma 
 Yann Toma, Monography (several langages), Supervised by Yann Toma, Foreword Édouard Glissant, 10 authors, Éditions Jannink, Paris, 672 pages, illustrations, 2011.
 Yann Toma, Journal-affiche numéro 1 (Yann Toma, Newspaper-poster number 1), François Noudelmann, Monography in english / french, Editions Jannink, Paris, 2009.
 Ouest-Lumière, Paul Ardenne, Isthme Éditions (publisher), FIACRE DAP, 128p, Paris, 2004.
 La cheminée phosphorescente (The phosphorescent Fireplace), S. Wright, V. Da Costa, C. Bayle, Victoires Éditions, 64p, Paris, 2000.

References

External links
 "Yann Toma" Monography. Official website of Jannink Publishing.
 Tracks – Art Entreprise – Chef-d'œuvres en boîte (Chef-d'œuvres in box). Television program "Tracks" about Ouest-Lumière : " The company and artist's life, two opposite concepts? Not in the parallel world of the critical companies, These hybrid entities which mix(involve) the art with suits-ties", Sophie Peyrard's report, Broadcast on October 7, 2010. Official website of the TV channel ARTE. National French and German TV channel.
 Émission "Les Passagers de la nuit" (The Night passengers), "L'inclassable Yann Toma" (Unclassifiable Yann Toma), France Culture. Radio program of November 16, 2009, "L'inclassable Yann Toma", Presented by Manual Calmat and Gilles Davidas.
 Œuvres, biographie et expositions, BOUROUINA GALLERY.
 Ouest Lumière, Official website of Yann Toma et Ouest Lumière
 Official website of Yann Toma et Ouest Lumière à l'ONU, Permanent Mission of Ouest-Lumière to the United Unions
 Référence sur CERAP, Yann Toma profile
 Art & Flux, Official website of Art & Flux, Monitoring Observatory of research (theoretical and critical) and laboratory of experiment and artistic production.
 OHM Transmission

Living people
French contemporary artists
1969 births